Dansk (also known as Dansk & Christiansen) was the brand name of cars built by Dansk Automobil & Cyclefabrik in Copenhagen, Denmark, between 1901 and 1907. The company had been a bicycle repair shop before venturing into automobile construction. It built three- and four-wheel light cars with German Cudell engines. The factory also produced light buses and trucks in small numbers.

References

External links 
 http://www.gtue-oldtimerservice.de

Car manufacturers of Denmark